Athens High School (AHS) is a public high school in The Plains, Ohio which is located in southeast Ohio.  It is the only high school in the Athens City School District. The AHS mascot is a Bulldog, and its school colors are green and gold. The Plains is located five miles (8 km) northwest of Athens, Ohio.

History

The first public supported Athens High School in Athens, Ohio graduated nine students in 1859. Athens High School held classes in at least three different buildings from the 1850s until the current building opened in The Plains in  1968.  Athens High School as known today was formed in 1967 by the merger of the students from The Plains High School, Chauncey-Dover High School, and Athens High School.

On September 16, 2010, a tornado came over The Plains, destroying/damaging many homes and businesses plus destroying most of the football field/track, and damaging the high school.  With the help of many, the school reopened in four days and the stadium/track was rebuilt by September 2011.

Today Athens High School is home for students in grades 9th - 12th with many students grade 11th - 12th attending classes at Tri-County Career Center in Nelsonville.

School Information
In the last ten years the student body has ranged in size from 180 to 230 per-grade level. The school has a number of students each year use the post secondary enrollment options which enables students to take college classes for high school & college credit.  This is free to the student and their parents.

Advanced Placement courses include; English Language & Composition, US History, European History, Chemistry, Physics B, Calculus AB, US Government & Politics, Spanish & French Language.

In the 2013-2014 school year, Athens High School received an 83.5% Performance Index, with 91.2% of its students graduating in four years.

Graduation Requirements include 4 Units of English, 3 Units of Social Studies, Science, & Mathematics, 1/2 Unit of Arts/Humanities, Health, Practical Arts, and PE. 
In a normal graduating class, 60% to 70% of students plan on attending a 4-year college, with 15% to 25% attending a 2-year college.

Clubs and activities
Athens High School offers student leadership activities;  the Youth Climate Action Team (YCAT), Student Council, Key Club, National Honor Society, Interact Club, and Model United Nations.   Co-Curricular activities offered are:  Movie Club, Matrix (school newspaper), Arena (yearbook), Multicultural Club, Chess Club, Drama Club, Environmental Endeavors (Ecology Club), Game Club, FCCLA/HERO, French Club, Masquers & Thespians, Mock Trial, and Spanish Club.  Music Activities include: Concert Band, Jazz Band, Marching Band, Color Guard, Vocal Music, and Chorale groups. The high school also offers a weekly NA and AA meeting that runs from 12-8 every Wednesday that is only for students.

Athletics
Athens High School is a member school of the Ohio High School Athletic Association.  It offers 11 boys sports  (Cheerleading, Baseball, Basketball, Cross Country, Football, Golf, Swimming & Diving, Soccer, Tennis, Track & Field and Wrestling) and 11 girls sports (Cheerleading, Basketball, Cross Country, Golf, Softball, Swimming & Diving, Soccer, Tennis, Track & Field, Volleyball, and Wrestling). The 2014 Bulldogs football team was the first team ever to make it to the OHSAA state final, but lost the contest to Toledo Central Catholic 56-52 to finish 14-1 for the season. In late 2019, Athens High School officially renamed their football stadium after 2015 graduate and 2019 Heisman Trophy winner Joe Burrow, after his Heisman Trophy acceptance speech brought in over $600K in donations to the Athens County Food Pantry.

SEOAL
The original Athens High School was a charter member of the Southeastern Ohio Athletic League (SEOAL) in 1925.  The consolidated high school also competed in the SEOAL from 1967-2008.  The Athens 1925 football team was the first Bulldog team to win SEOAL championship and the 2008 wrestling and tennis teams were the last sports teams to win the SEOAL. Over those years Athens Bulldog teams in every sport enjoyed many SEOAL championships.  In the fall of 2008, the Bulldogs began competition as a member of the Tri-Valley Conference (Ohio Division).

TVC - Tri-Valley Conference
The Bulldogs belong to the Ohio High School Athletic Association (OHSAA) and in the fall of 2008 joined the Tri-Valley Conference, a 16-member athletic conference located in southeastern Ohio.  The conference is divided into two divisions based on school size.  The Ohio Division features the larger schools, including Athens, and the Hocking Division features the smaller schools.

Notable alumni
 Joe Burrow – Quarterback for the Cincinnati Bengals, Heisman Trophy winner 
 Dow Finsterwald – Professional golfer; won 1958 PGA Championship.
 Atul Gawande – Boston general surgeon, Harvard University professor, and writer
 Stephen Kappes – Deputy Director of the Central Intelligence Agency during the George W. Bush and Barack Obama administrations
 Maya Lin – creator of the Vietnam Veterans Memorial in Washington, D.C.
 David Wilhelm – Campaign Manager for Bill Clinton in 1992, Chairman of the Democratic National Committee 1993-1994.

See also
 Ohio High School Athletic Conferences
 Tri-Valley Conference

References

External links
 District Website

High schools in Athens County, Ohio
Public high schools in Ohio
1967 establishments in Ohio
Educational institutions established in 1967